is a prefecture of Japan located on the island of Kyūshū. Kumamoto Prefecture borders Fukuoka Prefecture to the north, Ōita Prefecture to the northeast, Miyazaki Prefecture to the southeast, and Kagoshima Prefecture to the south.

Kumamoto is the capital and largest city of Kumamoto Prefecture, with other major cities including Yatsushiro, Amakusa, and Tamana. Kumamoto Prefecture is located in the center of Kyūshū on the coast of the Ariake Sea, across from Nagasaki Prefecture, with the mainland separated from the East China Sea by the Amakusa Archipelago.

History 
 

Historically, the area was called Higo Province; and the province was renamed Kumamoto during the Meiji Restoration. The creation of prefectures was part of the abolition of the feudal system.  The current Japanese orthography for Kumamoto literally means "bear root/origin", or "origin of the bear".

Geography 

Kumamoto Prefecture is in the center of Kyushu, the southernmost of the four major Japanese islands. It is bordered by the Ariake inland sea and the Amakusa archipelago to the west, Fukuoka Prefecture and Ōita Prefecture to the north, Miyazaki Prefecture to the east, and Kagoshima Prefecture to the south.

Mount Aso, an extensive active volcano, is in the east of Kumamoto Prefecture. This volcano is located at the centre of the Aso caldera.

As of 31 March 2019, 21% of the total land area of the prefecture was designated as natural parks: the Aso Kujū and Unzen-Amakusa National Parks; Kyūshū Chūō Sanchi and Yaba-Hita-Hikosan Quasi-National Parks; and Ashikita Kaigan, Itsuki Gokanoshō, Kinpōzan, Misumi-Ōyano Umibe, Okukuma, Shōtaisan, and Yabe Shūhen Prefectural Natural Parks.

Cities

Fourteen cities are located in Kumamoto Prefecture:

Towns and villages
These are the towns and villages in each district:

Mergers

Demographics 
The prefecture ranks 23rd in Japan.

Economy 

There is a Honda motorcycle plant.

Tourism 
Mount Aso is one of the world's largest active volcanoes.
Kumamoto Castle
Suizenji Park
Tsūjun Bridge, the largest stone aqueduct in Japan is in Yamato
The prefecture has a mascot named "Kumamon", a black bear with red cheeks, who was created to attract tourists to the region after the Kyushu Shinkansen line opened.

Education

Universities

National 
Kumamoto University

Public 
Kumamoto Prefectural University

Private 
Kumamoto Gakuen University
Kyushu University of Nursing and Social Welfare
Kyushu Lutheran College
Kumamoto Health Science
Shokei Gakuin University
Sojo University
Heisei College of Music

Transportation

Rail 
JR Kyushu
Kyushu Shinkansen
Kagoshima Line
Hohi Line
Hisatsu Line
Misumi Line
Kumamoto Electric Railway
Kumagawa Railroad
Minami Aso Railway
Hisatsu Orange Railway

Tramway 
Kumamoto City Transportation Bureau

Road

Expressways and toll roads 
Kyushu Expressway
South Kyushu Expressway
Kumamoto Amakusa Road

National highways 
 Route 3
 Route 57
 Route 208 (Kumamoto-Tamana-Arao-Ōmuta)
 Route 212
 Route 218 (Kumamoto-Takachiho-Nobeoka)
 Route 219
 Route 265
 Route 266
 Route 267 (Hitoyoshi-Isa-Satsuma-Satsumasendai)
 Route 268
 Route 324
 Route 325 (Yamaga-Minamiaso-Takamori-Takachiho)
 Route 387
 Route 388 (Saiki-Nobeoka-Unomae)
 Route 389
 Route 442
 Route 443
 Route 445
 Route 501 (Ōmuta-Arao-Udo)
 Route 503

Ports

Ferry routes 
Kumamoto-Shimabara
Nagasu-Unzen
Ushibuka-Kuranomoto (Nagashima) 
Yatsushiro-Kamiamakusa
Reihoku-Nagasaki

Airport 
Kumamoto Airport
Amakusa Airport

Sports  

These sports teams are based in the prefecture:
Professional:
Roasso Kumamoto - Men's football and J League Second Division
Blaze Kumamoto - Men's association football
Mashiki Renaissance Kumamoto - Women's association football
Amateur:
Kumamoto Golden Larks - regional baseball
The Kumamoto Prefecture hosted the 2019 World Women's Handball Championship, having previously hosted the 1997 World Men's Handball Championship.

Sister cities 
Kumamoto Prefecture is the 'sister state/prefecture' of Montana in the United States.

Kumamoto has a sister city located in Texas named San Antonio, which holds an annual fall festival 'akimatsuri' for its Japanese citizens. In 2015 the mascot, 'Kumamon' visited as an honorary ambassador during the festival located at the Japanese Tea Gardens.

Notable people 

 Jun Kunimura, a popular Japanese actor
 Tetsu Komai, a Hollywood actor
 Kazuaki Kiriya, a filmmaker
 Kimeru, a pop artist
 Miku Kobato, founder and vocalist of Band-Maid
 Moe Kamikokuryou, a Japanese idol
 Yuri Masuda, singer
 Shodai Naoya, Sumo wrestler
 Tomiko Van, singer, vocalist of Do As Infinity
 Eiichiro Oda, manga author, creator of One Piece
 Yuki Midorikawa, manga author, creator of Natsume's Book of Friends and Hotarubi no Mori e
 Tetsuya Noda, contemporary artist
 Katsuhiro Ueo, drifting driver
 Ichiki Tatsuo, journalist and defector in the Indonesian National Revolution
 Madoka Hisagae, female Japanese fencer
 Hitomi Tanaka, pornographic actress
 Kenta Matsumoto, vocalist and bassist of WANIMA
 Koushin Nishida, guitarist of WANIMA
 Kouki Fujiwara, drummer of WANIMA

Notes

References

 Nussbaum, Louis-Frédéric and Käthe Roth. (2005).  Japan encyclopedia. Cambridge: Harvard University Press. ;  OCLC 58053128

External links 

 
 National Archives of Japan ... Kumamoto map (1891)
 

 
Kyushu region
Prefectures of Japan